The 1982 All-Pacific-10 Conference football team consists of American football players chosen by various organizations for All-Pacific-10 Conference teams for the 1982 NCAA Division I-A football season.

Offensive selections

Quarterbacks
 John Elway, Stanford
Tom Ramsey, UCLA

Running backs
 Jacque Robinson, Washington
 Vincent White, Stanford 
 Vance Johnson, Arizona

Wide receivers
 Cormac Carney, UCLA
 Paul Skansi, Washington

Tight ends
 Chris Dressel, Stanford

Tackles
Don Mosebar, USC
Harvey Salem, California

Guards
Jeff Kiewel, Arizona
Bruce Matthews, USC

Centers
Tony Slaton, USC

Defensive selections

Linemen
George Achica, USC
Jim Jeffcoat, Arizona St.
Karl Morgan, UCLA
Mike Walter, Oregon

Linebackers
Ricky Hunley, Arizona
Mark Stewart, Washington
Vernon Maxwell, Arizona St.
Jack Del Rio, USC

Defensive backs
 Mike Richardson, Arizona St.
 Joey Browner, USC
 Vaughn Williams, Stanford
 Al Gross, Arizona

Special teams

Placekickers
Chuck Nelson, Washington

Punters
 Mike Black, Arizona St.

Return specialists 
Steve Brown, Oregon

Key

See also
1982 College Football All-America Team

References

All-Pacific-10 Conference Football Team
All-Pac-12 Conference football teams